The 2019–20 season was the club's seventh season in the Scottish Premiership and their tenth consecutive season in the top flight of Scottish football. St Johnstone also competed in the Scottish Cup and the League Cup.

On 13 March, the Scottish football season was suspended with immediate effect due to the COVID-19 Coronavirus outbreak. On 18 May, the SPFL declared the end of the season determining on an average points per game with the Saints finishing in sixth place, jumping Hibernian in the final standings.

Season Summary
Tommy Wright remained as manager for the start of his seventh season in charge. St Johnstone were knocked out of League Cup at the Group Stage after losing three of the four matches played. The Saints were then thrashed 7–0 by Celtic on the opening day of the season. It didn't get much better for the Saints as they slumped to the bottom of the table before the September International break and remained there and were still win-less until mid-October. They won both their matches against Hamilton and Hearts to end their win-less run and lift them off the bottom. They went through December with four clean sheets, lifting the club up to ninth in the table. In March, they were knocked out of the Scottish Cup by Celtic, narrowly losing at home. They were seven matches unbeaten and up to seventh in the League but the season was halted due to the Coronavirus pandemic. On 9 April, the Scottish football season was further suspended until at least 10 June. On 2 May, manager Tommy Wright left the club.

Results & fixtures

Pre-season

Scottish Premiership

League Cup

Scottish Cup

Squad statistics

Appearances

|-
|colspan="17"|Player who left the club during the season
|-

|}

Team statistics

League table

League Cup table

Transfers

Players in

Players out

See also
List of St Johnstone F.C. seasons

Footnotes

References

St Johnstone F.C. seasons
St Johnstone